"Attitude" is a song by American rock band Alien Ant Farm. It was included on their second studio album, ANThology, and was released on March 18, 2002, as the album's third and final single (fourth if counting the re-release of "Movies". "Attitude" reached number 66 on the UK Singles Chart.

Release
Though the song was never released as an official single in the US, it was released as the third single from "ANThology" in the UK and the rest of Europe. A number of track listings for the song's CD single exist. The song is included on the band's 2013 "Icon" greatest hits album.

Commercial performance
The song debuted on the UK Singles chart on the chart dated May 25, 2002, at number 66. The following week, the song fell off of the chart. It was Alien Ant Farm's final chart entry in the UK.

Music video
A music video for the song was released in 2002. It mostly features the band performing the song, drinking, and pasting photographs onto a wall. The video was included on the band's "BUSted: The Definitive DVD" music video compilation.

Track listings

UK CD1
 "Attitude" – 4:54
 "Universe" (live version) – 5:46
 "Stranded" (acoustic version) – 4:11
 "Attitude" (CD-ROM video) – 3:57

UK CD2
 "Attitude" – 4:54
 "Attitude" (acoustic live version) – 5:26
 "Universe" (live video) – 5:46

UK cassette single
 "Attitude" – 4:54
 "Stranded" (acoustic version) – 4:11

European CD single
 "Attitude" (radio remix)
 "Universe" (live at The Quest, Minneapolis)

Australian CD single
 "Attitude" (radio remix)
 "Attitude" (live acoustic)
 "Universe" (live at The Quest, Minneapolis)
 "Stranded" (live acoustic)
 "Attitude" (video)
 "Universe" (video)

Charts

Release history

References

2002 singles
2002 songs
Alien Ant Farm songs
DreamWorks Records singles